Lyon Mountain station is a historic train station located at Lyon Mountain, Clinton County, New York.  The station was built by the Delaware and Hudson Railway in 1903, and is a long one-story, rectangular, wood-frame building with Late Victorian style design elements.  It has a hipped roof with wide overhanging eaves and topped by a cupola with a pyramidal roof. The station remained in use until 1949–1950, and later used as a post office and tavern. It is now a museum.

It was added to the National Register of Historic Places on February 14, 2002, as the Lyon Mountain Railroad Station.

See also
National Register of Historic Places listings in Clinton County, New York

References

External links
Lyon Mountain Mining and Railroad Museum

Railway stations on the National Register of Historic Places in New York (state)
Victorian architecture in New York (state)
Railway stations in the United States opened in 1903
Museums in Clinton County, New York
Former Delaware and Hudson Railway stations
National Register of Historic Places in Clinton County, New York
1903 establishments in New York (state)
Former railway stations in New York (state)